Irving Klaw (November 9, 1910 – September 3, 1966), self-named the "Pin-up King", was an influential American merchant of sexploitation, fetish, and Hollywood glamour pin-up photographs and films. Like his predecessor, Charles Guyette, who was also a merchant of fetish-themed photographs, Klaw was not a photographer, but a merchandiser of fetish art imagery and films. His great contribution to the world was to commission fetish art (with models like Bettie Page, June King, Joan Rydell, Jackie Miller, et al.) and sponsor illustrative artists (like Eric Stanton, Gene Bilbrew, and many others), and to indirectly promote the legacy of Charles Guyette and John Willie. Irving Klaw is a central figure in what fetish art historian Richard Pérez Seves has designated as the "Bizarre Underground," the pre-1970 fetish art years.

Movie Star News
Klaw was born Isadore Klaw in Brooklyn, New York. His business, which eventually became Movie Star News, began in 1938 when he and his sister Paula opened a struggling basement level used bookstore at 209 E. 14th St. in Manhattan.

After he discovered teenagers were frequently tearing out photos from his movie magazines, he switched to selling movie star stills and lobby photo cards which sold so well he stopped selling books and moved the store from the basement to the street-level storefront. Business thrived, and the self-named "Pin-Up King" moved to 212 E. 14th St., eventually taking the name Movie Star News. Klaw also had a brisk international mail-order business selling cheesecake photos and Hollywood glamour pin-ups.

Fetish art
In 1948, a collector/enthusiast known as Little John "inspired/sponsored Klaw's full-blown entry into the fetish art business." Irving Klaw was also influenced by magazine publisher Robert Harrison. Early Klaw fetish models included Harrison models Barbara Leslie, Vicky Hayes, Joan "Eve" Rydell, Lili Dawn, Shirley "Cici" Maitland, Kevin Daley, Roz Greenwood, and finally Bettie Page.

Inspired by John Willie, Klaw also commissioned and distributed illustrated adventure/bondage chapter serials by fetish artists Eric Stanton, Gene Bilbrew, Adolfo Ruiz, and others.

Burlesque features and bondage film-loops

After the surprise success of the B-movie Striporama, a 1953 burlesque revue with famous striptease artists and model Bettie Page, Klaw quickly duplicated the formula and directed his own burlesque features. Using a professional camera crew and richly saturated Eastman color filmstock, Varietease (1954) and Teaserama (1955) featured Lili St. Cyr, Tempest Storm, and Bettie Page (and were released on DVD in the U.S. in 2000). He produced and directed a third film in 1956, Buxom Beautease, without Page.

Also during this period Klaw set up weekend home-movie sessions where he produced scores of silent 8 mm and 16 mm black-and-white film loops. These featured striptease acts and an assortment of fetishistic subjects based on special requests from his clientele. Titles such as Riding the Human Pony Girl, Bondage in Leather Harness, and Booted Amazon Fights Again depicted women in skimpy lingerie and high heels engaging in elaborate bondage, cat-fights, spanking and slave training. Nearly all of these featurettes were shot on a single, sparsely decorated set, either in the studio above Movie Star News or at a nearby loft space. At least two films with Bettie Page (Rumble Seat Bondage and Jungle Girl Tied to Trees) were shot outdoors at secluded locations.

Still photos taken during the sessions were also sold at the store and in the bi-annual mail-order catalog Cartoon and Model Parade.

Censorship and early retirement
The Kefauver Hearings of the Senate Subcommittee on Juvenile Delinquency in 1957 marked the beginning of the end of Irving Klaw's mail-order fetish art business in New York. The investigation tried to link pornography to juvenile delinquency. The McCarthy-style hearings branded Klaw as a degenerate pornographer and ushered in a new wave of media censorship. Bettie Page was also summoned to the hearings but was never called to testify (parts of the hearings are recreated in the film The Notorious Bettie Page). She retired from modeling soon afterwards.
Because of the political, social and legal pressures he faced, Klaw closed his storefront business and burned many of his negatives. It is estimated that more than 80% of the negatives were destroyed. However, his sister Paula secretly kept some of the better images, which can be seen today.

Final years

After the Senate hearings and the ensuing legal difficulties with state authorities, Klaw was barred from continuing his business in New York. Shortly thereafter he moved his Nutrix Publishing Company, along with the associated Satellite Publications (Stanley Malkin & Pat Martini), to an office building in Jersey City, New Jersey. Both companies sold similar fetish-oriented photos and magazines.

To further avoid prosecution, Klaw's Nutrix publishing imprint was restricted to a mail-order-only business. For several years he published a number of small illustrated bondage/fetish photo-booklets. Titles such as Girl Psycho Handled with Restraint (1960), which includes old photos of Bettie Page, Girls Punishment at School of Discipline (1962), Tortured Models in the Wax Exhibit (1962), and Paddled Severely During Sorority Initiation (1963) are typical examples. Eventually he sold this business to Ed Mishkin, who changed the company name from Nutrix to Mutrix, adding the first initial of his last name.

Klaw relocated to Florida where he briefly returned to filmmaking in 1963, producing two films: Larry Wolk's Intimate Diary of an Artist's Model and Nature's Sweethearts, co-directing the latter. Photographer Bunny Yeager worked closely with him during this period. She had multiple duties on these films, including casting, writing dialog, etc. Unlike his previous movies, both pictures were exploitation "nudie cuties" that featured a number of topless women. Irving continued to photograph bondage in Miami as well, with models like Maria Stinger.

Irving Klaw died on September 3, 1966, from complications of untreated appendicitis. He was survived by two sons, Arthur and Jeffrey. His nephew Ira Kramer, son of Paula and Jack Kramer, took over the family business, Movie Star News, which was located on 18th Street but closed in 2012, and relocated to Las Vegas, Nevada.

Klaw was portrayed by Dukey Flyswatter in the 2004 biographical film Bettie Page: Dark Angel and by Chris Bauer in the 2005 film The Notorious Bettie Page.

Klaw was mentioned in Archer, Season 11, Episode 4, Robot Factory.

Legacy
Due to the revival of interest in Bettie Page that began in the 1980s, various compilations of Klaw's films have been released on video and DVD. Background music and narration were added to the silent fetish loops for the two-volume video Irving Klaw Bondage Classics (1984) by London Enterprises.

In 2005, Cult Epics released both volumes on one DVD under the title Bettie Page: Bondage Queen. Also in 2005, Cult Epics put out Bettie Page: Pin Up Queen, a DVD compilation of her burlesque performances from Striporama, Varietease and Teaserama, plus six black-and-white film loops of dancing and a cat-fight.

More of Klaw's bondage film reels, including one with Bettie Page, are in DVD format in Bizarro Sex Loops (Volumes 4 and 20). These are compilations of vintage fetish films released by Something Weird Video (2008).

In 2012 Klaw was inducted into the Leather Hall of Fame.

Further reading
Eric Stanton & the History of the Bizarre Underground by Richard Pérez Seves. Atglen: Schiffer Publishing, 2018. 
Charles Guyette: Godfather of American Fetish Art [*Expanded Photo Edition*]  by Richard Pérez Seves. New York: FetHistory, 2018.

Filmography

Striporama (1953)
Varietease (1954)
Teaserama (1955)
Buxom Beautease (1956)
Intimate Diary of an Artist's Model (1963) – producer
Nature's Sweethearts (1963) – producer
Irving Klaw Bondage Classics Volume I & II (London Enterprises 1984)
Bettie Page: Bondage Queen (Cult Epics 2005)
Bettie Page: Pin Up Queen (Cult Epics 2005)
Bizarro Sex Loops Volume 4 (Something Weird Video 2007)
Bizarro Sex Loops Volume 20 (Something Weird Video 2008)

References

External links

Movie Star News – Preserving Hollywood Since 1938 archived October 26, 2016
Irving Klaw's Antique Erotica, Vintage Erotica archived August 2, 2014

American erotic photographers
20th-century American Jews
BDSM people
Bondage riggers
Deaths from appendicitis
Fetish photographers
People from Brooklyn
Place of death missing
1910 births
1966 deaths